Goetheana is a genus of hymenopteran insects of the family Eulophidae.

Species
The genus includes the following species:

 Goetheana incerta Annecke, 1962 
 Goetheana kobzari Gumovsky, 2016
 Goetheana pushkini Triapitsyn, 2005  
 Goetheana rabelaisi Triapitsyn, 2005  
 Goetheana shakespearei Girault, 1920

References
Key to Nearctic eulophid genera 
Universal Chalcidoidea Database 

Eulophidae